Nigel Marples (born November 3, 1985) is a Canadian football player and coach.

Career

College
Marples attended North Delta High School and played college soccer at Towson University, where he was a four-year starter and two year captain. During his college years he also played with the Abbotsford Rangers in the USL Premier Development League.

Professional
Marples joined the professional ranks after graduation with the Vancouver Whitecaps of USL First Division, but only appeared in 2 matches and was released.  He then turned to indoor soccer after being drafted by the Philadelphia KiXX.  He appeared in 27 games before moving back outdoors with USL Second Division Harrisburg City Islanders, and then on to the Charleston Battery in 2009.

Marples joined HB Køge from the Danish 1st Division on 9 August 2012. He left the club in summer 2013 and returned to Vancouver.

International
Marples has also spent time in the Canadian U-20 player pool, but has yet to be capped.

as Coach 
After his return in summer 2013 to Canada, was named as Head coach of the Roman Tulis European Soccer School of Excellence. Since October 2013 works besides his coaching career by the Roman Tulis Soccer School, as Player-Coach of the BC Premier Soccer League side Fusion FC in Richmond. Marples studied Masters in Coaching Education over distance learning on the Ohio University.  He is currently the Head Soccer Coach at the Principia School (2017).

References

External links
Charleston Battery bio
Harrisburg City Islanders bio
Philadelphia KiXX bio

1985 births
Fraser Valley Mariners players
Living people
Soccer people from British Columbia
People from Delta, British Columbia
Canadian soccer players
Philadelphia KiXX (2001–2008 MISL) players
USL First Division players
Vancouver Whitecaps (1986–2010) players
USL League Two players
USL Second Division players
USL Championship players
Penn FC players
Charleston Battery players
HB Køge players
Towson Tigers men's soccer players
Canadian expatriate soccer players
Expatriate men's footballers in Denmark
Association football defenders